= Moshir Intersection =

Moshir intersection is an intersection in central Shiraz, Iran between Lotfali Khan Street, Qa'ani Street and Tohid (Dariush) Street.

== Transportation ==
=== Streets ===
- Lotfali Khan Street
- Tohid (Dariush) Street
- North Qa'ani Street

=== Buses ===
- Route 4
- Route 35
- Route 39
- Route 155
